Voice of Men was formed in 2009 by a group of students in UTM Skudai to participate in Malaysia TV9's reality program called Akademi Nasyid. They came from Engineering background (mostly) with determination in singing in a vocal group. Voice of Men has released their debut album online Laungan Cinta, an internationally successful album produced by Damian Mikhail, in 2013. Recently in 2015, they have released a few singles as their follow-up album Women We Love, Pesan Abah Buat Amina, This Is My War under the same production company.

Voice of Men, once famous with their parody video of Hijab Makes You Beautiful was one of the top 16 contestants in the Awakening Talent Contest.

Discography

Albums

Singles 
Saranghaeyo
 Released: March 2020
 Label: VMEN Resources
Women We Love
 Released: November 2014
 Label: VMEN Resources

Pesan Abah Buat Amina
 Released: February 2014
 Label: VMEN Resources

Mini album
This Is My War featuring Ameen Misran
 Released: May 2015
 Label: VMEN Resources
 Formats: iTunes/Spotify/Deezer/KKBOX
 Total Tracks: 6 Tracks

Personal life 
Fathul & Lutfi Voice of Men is married.

References

External links

1987 births
Living people
Malaysian people of Malay descent
Malaysian Muslims
Malay-language singers